Arthur Armstrong may refer to:

Arthur Armstrong (painter) (1924–1996), painter from Northern Ireland
Tommy Armstrong (New Zealand politician) (Arthur Ernest Armstrong, 1902–1980), New Zealand politician
Arthur James Armstrong (1924–2018), American bishop of the United Methodist Church